Jan is a form of John that is used in various languages. (See the “Other names” section in this page’s infobox for more variants.)

The name is used in Afrikaans, Belarusian, Circassian, Catalan, Cornish, Croatian, Czech, Devon dialect, Dutch, German, Kazakh, Polish, Slovak, Slovenian, Scandinavian and Finnic languages. It is the most prevalent in Czech Republic.  In English, the name "Jan" is unrelated to "John", but is a shortened form of the first names Janice, January or Janet, with corresponding pronunciation. It has a separate origin in Persian, Greek, and Armenian.

Netherlands and Flanders
In the Netherlands and Flanders, the name used to be one of the most popular given first names. From the 1950s the occurrence of the name decreased. In 2014, no more than 3% of the boys are given this name. However, it still is one of the most widely distributed names. It is also the most common name of Dutch players in the Netherlands national football team.

The name Jan is sometimes combined with another first name, such as in Jan Peter (for instance in Jan Peter Balkenende), or in Klaas Jan (for instance in Klaas Jan Huntelaar). Very rarely the name Jan is given to a girl, as variants like Jannie, Janneke or Jantje are more common.

Because it used to be so common, it found its way into many expressions still widely used today, even though the popularity of the name itself has faded. "Jan met de pet", literally "Jan wearing a cap", signifies the common man; and "Jan en alleman", literally "Jan and everyman", signifies a large group of people, often used when referring to a cross-section of society.

People (first name)
 Jan (ispán) (fl. 1071), Hungarian noble

A–F
 Jan Akkerman (born 1946), Dutch rock musician
 Jan Baalsrud (1917–1988), Norwegian commando
 Jan Peter Balkenende (born 1956), Dutch politician and former prime minister of the Netherlands
 Jan Baudouin de Courtenay (1845–1929), Polish linguist and Slavist
 Jan Bednarek (born 1996), Polish professional footballer 
 Jan van Bemmel (born 1938), Dutch medical informatician
 Jan Krzysztof Bielecki (born 1951), Polish liberal politician and economist, former Prime Minister of Poland
 Jan Björklund (born 1962), Swedish politician
 Jan Błachowicz (born 1983), Polish professional mixed martial artist
 Jan Boháček (born 1969), Czech ice hockey player
 Jan de Bont (born 1943), Dutch cinematographer, producer, and film director
 Jan Borgman (1929–2021), Dutch astronomer
 Jan Brewer (born 1944), former governor of Arizona
 Jan Broberg (born 1962), American actress, singer, dancer and twice victim of kidnapping by a family friend. 
 Jan Buijs (1889–1961), Dutch architect
 Jan Choinski (born 1996), British tennis player
 Jan Czekanowski (1882–1965), Polish anthropologist, statistician, ethnographer, traveller, and linguist
 Jan Czerlinski (born 1967), Czech ice hockey player
 Jan Czerski (1845–1892), Polish paleontologist, osteologist, geologist, geographer and explorer of Siberia
 Jan Czochralski (1885–1953), Polish chemist
 Jan Henryk Dąbrowski (1755–1818), Polish general and statesman
 Jan Derbyshire, Canadian writer and comedian
 Jan Dijkstra (1910–1993), Dutch mayor
 Jan Domarski (born 1946), Polish footballer 
 Jan Drenth (born 1925), Dutch chemist
 Jan-Krzysztof Duda (born 1998), Polish chess grandmaster
 Jan Egeland (born 1957), former UN humanitarian official, from Norway
 Jan Enquist (1925–2005), Swedish Navy rear admiral
 Jan Erixon (born 1962), Swedish former professional hockey player
 Jan Evangelista Purkyně (1787–1869), Czech anatomist, and physiologist, discoverer of Purkinje cells

F–L
 Jan Fedder (1955–2019), German actor 
 Jan Fontein (1927–2017), Dutch art historian
 Jan Garbarek (born 1947), Norwegian jazz saxophonist
 Jan Geersing (1940–2021), Dutch politician
 Jan E. Goldstein (born 1946), Norman and Edna Freehling Professor of History at the University of Chicago.
 Jan van Gooswilligen (1935–2008), Dutch field hockey player
 Jan van der Graaf (1937–2022), Dutch church administrator
 Jan Grabowski (born 1962), Polish-Canadian historian
 Jan Guillou (born 1944), Swedish journalist and author
 Jan-Gunnar Isberg (1947–2022), Swedish brigadier general
 Jan Gunnar Røise (born 1975), Norwegian actor
 Jan Gustafsson (born 1979), German chess Grandmaster 
 Jan Hammer (born 1948), Czech musician
 Jan de Hartog (1914–2002), Dutch writer
 Jan Heweliusz (1611–1687), Polish astronomer
 Jan van Hooff (born 1936), Dutch biologist
 Jan Hooks (1957–2014), American actress
 Jan Howard (1929–2020), American country music singer
 Jan Hron (born 1941), Czech agroscientist, Rector of University of Life Sciences Prague 
 Jan Huitema (born 1984), Dutch politician
 Jan Hus (burned 1415), Czech religious reformer
 Jan Jacobsz May, Dutch seafarer and explorer
 Jan Jagla (born 1981), German basketball player
 Jan Mohammad Jamali, Afghan politician
 Jan Janský (1873–1921), Czech scientist, first classified 4 blood types
 Jan Jonsson (1952–2021), Swedish Air Force officer
 Jan Kalvoda, (born 1953), Czech politician and lawyer
 Jan Karski (1914–2000), Polish soldier, resistance-fighter, and diplomat
 Jan Kefer (1906–1941), Czech theurgist, astrologist and occult writer
 Jan Mohammed Khan (died 2011), Afghan politician
 Jan Kickert (born 1964), Austrian Permanent Representative to the United Nations
 Jan Koller (born 1973), Czech footballer
 Jan Amos Komenský (1592–1670), Czech teacher, scientist, educator, and writer
 Jan Koum (born 1976), Ukrainian ex. software infrastructure engineer, creator of WhatsApp
 Jan O. Korbel (born 1975), German biologist
 Jan Korte (born 1956), Dutch footballer and manager
 Jan Kubiš (1913–1942), Czech soldier 
 Jan Kubíček (1927–2013), Czech painter
 Jan Kulczyk (1950–2015), Polish billionaire businessman
 Jan Kvalheim (born 1963), Norwegian beach volleyball player
 Jan Laštůvka (born 1982), Czech footballer
 Jan Lisiecki (born 1995), Polish-Canadian pianist
 Jan Lucemburský (1296–1346), king of Bohemia
 Jan Łaski (1499–1560), Polish Calvinist reformer
 Jan Łukasiewicz (1878–1956), Polish logician and philosopher

M–Z
 Jan Martín (born 1984), German-Israeli-Spanish basketball player
 Jan Masaryk (1886–1948), Czech diplomat and politician
 Jan Matejko (1838–1893), Polish painter
 Jan Matulka (1890–1972), Czech-American painter
 Jan Mazurkiewicz (1896–1988), Polish military leader and politician
 Jan Močnik (born 1987), Slovenian basketball player
 Jan Morris (born 1963), Welsh historian, author and travel writer.
 Jan Mølby (born 1963), Danish footballer.
 Jan Murray (1916–2006), American stand-up comedian
 Jan Nagórski (1888–1976), Polish engineer and pioneer of aviation
 Jan Nepomucký (c. 1345–1393), Czech saint
 Jan Neruda (1834–1891), Czech journalist, writer and poet
 Jan Nowak-Jeziorański (1914–2005), Polish journalist, writer, politician and social worker
 Jan Oblak (born 1993), Slovenian professional footballer (goalkeeper)
 Jan Oort (1900–1992), Dutch astronomer
 Jan Õun (born 1977), Estonian footballer
 Jan Palach (1948–1969), Czech student self-immolated in 1969 protesting against the Soviet invasion
 Jan Peerce (1904-1984), American operatic tenor
 Jan Pieterszoon Coen (1587–1629), officer of the Dutch East India Company
 Jan Podebradský (born 1974), Czech decathlete
 Jan Polák (born 1981), Czech footballer
 Jan Potocki (1761–1815), Polish nobleman, novelist, ethnologist, linguist and traveller
 Jan Ravens (born 1958), English actress
 Jan Reehorst (born 1923), Dutch politician
 Jan van Riebeeck (1619–1677), Dutch seafarer and explorer
 Jan Rodowicz (1923–1949), Polish Home Army soldier
 Jan Rubeš (1920–2009), Czech-Canadian singer and actor
 Jan van Ruiten (1931–2016), Dutch politician
 Jan Sladký Kozina (1652–1695), Czech revolutionary leader of Chodové
 Jan Šimák (born 1978), Czech footballer
 Jan Smuts (1870–1950), South African statesman
 Jan Shearer (born 1958), New Zealand sailor 
 Jan Sobieski (1629–1696), King of Poland and Grand Duke of Lithuania from 1674 until his death in 1696
 Jan Soukup (born 1979), Czech karateka and kickboxer
 Jan Staaf (born 1962), Swedish race walker
 Jan Šťastný (c.1764–c.1830) was a Czech composer.
 Jan Šťastný (canoeist) (born 1970), Czech canoeist
 Ján Šťastný (hockey player) (born 1982), Slovak hockey player
 Jan Steen (c.1626–1679), Dutch artist
 Jan Stenerud (born 1942), Norwegian American football player
 Jan Paul Strid (1947–2018), Swedish toponymist
 Jan Stussy (1921–1990), American artist
 Jan Szczepanik (1872–1926), Polish inventor
 Jan Szymański (born 1989), Polish speed skater
 Jan Tomaszewski (born 1948), Polish footballer
 Jan Ullrich (born 1973), German former professional road bicycle racer
 Jan van der Marck (1929–2010) Dutch-born American museum administrator, art historian, and curator.
 Jan Van Loon, Dutch settler
 Jan Veentjer (1938–2020), Dutch field hockey player
 Jan Verroken (1917–2020), Belgian politician
 Jan Vertonghen (born 1987), Belgian footballer 
 Jan Erazim Vocel (1803–1871), Czech poet, archaeologist, historian and cultural revivalist
 Jan Vetter (born 1963), lead singer of German punk band Die Ärzte, commonly known as Farin Urlaub
 Jan Uuspõld (born 1973), Estonian actor and musician 
 Jan-Michael Vincent (1944–2019), American actor
 Jan Washausen (born 1988), German footballer
 Jan-Michael Williams (born 1984), Trinidadian footballer
 Jan de Wit (born 1945), Dutch politician and lawyer
 Jan Wohlschlag (born 1958), American high jumper
 Jan Zamoyski (1542–1605), Polish nobleman and magnate
 Jan Dismas Zelenka (1679–1745), Czech baroque composer
 Jan Žižka z Trocnova (c.1360–1424), Czech hussite leader
 Jan Zoon (1923–2016), Dutch politician
 Jan Zumbach (1915–1986), Polish fighter pilot and a flying ace during World War II
 Jan Żabiński (1897–1974), Polish soldier, educator and scientist

People (middle name)
 Kim Dickens (born Kimberly Jan Dickens) (born 1965), American actress

People (last name)
 Dominique Jan, Columbia University surgeon
 Georg Jan (1791–1866), Italian taxonomist
 Masood Jan, Pakistani blind cricketer

In popular culture
 "Jan" - Grease (1978)
 "Jan Brady - née Jan Martin" - The Brady Bunch (1969–1974)
 "Jan Levinson" - The Office (2005–2013)
 "Jan Valek" - Vampires (1998)
 "Jan" - Bring It On (2000)
 "Jan Arrah" - Element Lad from the Legion of Superheroes

See also

Notes

References

Belarusian masculine given names
Circassian masculine given names
Circassian feminine given names
Czech masculine given names
Dutch masculine given names
English feminine given names
Estonian masculine given names
German masculine given names
Norwegian masculine given names
Polish masculine given names
Scandinavian masculine given names
Swedish masculine given names